Timiskaming South was a Canadian electoral district represented in the House of Commons of Canada from 1925 to 1935. It was located in the northeastern part of the province of Ontario. It was created in 1924 from parts of Nipissing and Timiskaming ridings.

It consisted of the southern portion of Timiskaming District, along with portions of Nipissing District and Sudbury District.

The electoral district was abolished in 1933 when it was redistributed between Nipissing and Timiskaming ridings.

Members of Parliament for Timiskaming South
Ernest Frederick Armstrong, Conservative (1925–1926)
Malcolm Lang, Labour (1926–1930)
Wesley Gordon, Conservative (1930–1935)

Electoral history

|- 
  
|Conservative
|Ernest Frederick  ARMSTRONG
|align="right"|5,362 

|Labour
|Malcolm   LANG
|align="right"| 4,558 

|Labour
|Harold Milton Tremaine   WELCH
|align="right"|1,882
|}

|- 

|Labour
|Malcolm   LANG
|align="right"| 7,309 
  
|Conservative
|Ernest Frederick   ARMSTRONG
|align="right"|6,411   
|}

|- 
  
|Conservative
|Wesley Ashton   GORDON
|align="right"| 8,729
  
|Liberal-Labour
|Malcolm   LANG
|align="right"| 7,195 
|}

|- 
  
|Conservative
|Hon. Wesley Ashton   GORDON
|align="right"| acclaimed   
|}

See also 

 List of Canadian federal electoral districts
 Past Canadian electoral districts

External links 

 Website of the Parliament of Canada

Former federal electoral districts of Ontario